Eduard Selami is an Albanian politician. From 1992 to 1995 he served as Chairman of the Democratic Party of Albania. On 5 March 1995, he was ousted as Chairman of the Democratic party.

References

Living people
Leaders of the Democratic Party of Albania
People from Librazhd
Year of birth missing (living people)